Wen is a Chinese surname. ), meaning "warm", is sometimes romanised as Wen or Vun in Taiwan, Ôn in Vietnamese, Wan in Cantonese, or Wen/Won/Wan/Bong/Voon/Oon/woon/Man/Mun in Malaysia. According to a 2013 study it was found to be the 104th-most common surname, shared by 2,170,000 people or 0.160% of the population, with the province with the most people being Guangdong.

Origins
 from Wen (溫), the name of an ancient state during the Western Zhou dynasty. During the Spring and Autumn period this state was annexed by Di and the Prince of Wen fled to the state of Wey. His descendants acquired then name of their origins state as their surname.
 from the place-name Wen (溫), a fief granted to Wen Ji (溫季), an official in Jin during the Spring and Autumn period
 from the Chi Wen (叱溫), Wen Pen (溫盆), and Wen Gu (溫孤) families of the Xianbei people 
 from the personal name of Wen Sheng (溫昇), who went into exile and changed his original surname, Liu (劉), to Wen after his father, Liu Yicong (劉易從), an official in the Tang dynasty, suffered persecution and death.

Notable people
 Wen Jiao (溫嶠) (288–329), courtesy name Taizhen (太真), formally Duke Zhongwu of Shi'an (始安忠武公), was a renowned Jin Dynasty (266–420) general and governor.
 Wen Dalin (575–637), courtesy name Yanbo,[1] better known as Wen Yanbo, posthumously known as Duke Gong of Yu, was a Chinese official who lived in the early Tang Dynasty
 Ming-Na Wen (溫明娜; born 1963) a Chinese–American actress
Wen Tingyun (812–870), Tang dynasty poet
Wen Yang (chess player) (温阳; born 1988) Chinese chess player who became China's 25th Grandmaster
Wen Jiabao (born 1942), Premier of the People's Republic of China from 2003 to 2013
Deric Wan (born 1964), Hong Kong actor and singer
Irene Wan (born 1967), Hong Kong actress
Leana Wen (born 1983), Chinese-born American physician
Wen Shang-yi (Monster) (溫尚翊; born 1976), is one of the two guitarists and leader of the Taiwanese rock band, Mayday

References

Individual Chinese surnames